Shpanberg Island (ostrov Shpanberga), sometimes Spanberg Island, is an island of the Nordenskiöld Archipelago in the Kara Sea, off the coast of Siberia. 

Administratively this island belongs to the Krasnoyarsk Krai Federal subject of Russia and is part of the Great Arctic State Nature Reserve, the largest nature reserve of Russia.

Geography
Shpanberg Island is located in the central area of the archipelago on the southern side of the Lenin Strait. Cape Razvodnoy (мыс Разводной) is the headland at its SE end and Cape Ustalosti (мыс Усталости) at its NE end. 

It is part of the Pakhtusov Islands (острова Пахтусова) subgroup of the Nordenskiöld Archipelago. The closest islands are Petersen Island  to the southeast, Dobrynia Nikitich Island to the SW and Pakhtusov Island  to the west.

The climate in the archipelago is severe and the sea surrounding the island is covered with fast ice in the winter and often obstructed by pack ice even in the summer.

History
In 1900, the islands of the Nordenskiöld Archipelago were explored by Russian Navy Captain Fyodor Matisen, who named most of them. The survey was done during the first wintering of the Russian polar expedition of 1900–02 on behalf of the Imperial Russian Academy of Sciences led by geologist Baron Eduard Von Toll aboard ship Zarya. 

This island was named after the Dano-Russian naval officer and explorer Martin Spanberg, who served as one of Vitus Bering's lieutenants in both Kamchatka expeditions, performed the first Russian diplomatic mission to Japan, and helped accelerate Russian occupation of the Kurils in series of voyages in 1738, 1739, and 1742.

Further reading
Albert Hastings Markham. Arctic Exploration, 1895

References

External links
Shpanberg Island; Wikimapia

Islands of the Nordenskiöld Archipelago
Islands of Krasnoyarsk Krai